Skillz is an online mobile multiplayer video game competition platform that is integrated into a number of iOS and Android games. Players use it to compete in competitions against other players across the world.

History  
Skillz was founded in 2012 by Andrew Paradise and Casey Chafkin in Boston, though the company's headquarters is now located in San Francisco.

Through different rounds of funding, Skillz has raised $53 million from venture capitalists including Liberty Global, Telstra, Accomplice, Wildcat Capital, as well as the owners of the New England Patriots, Milwaukee Bucks, New York Mets, and Sacramento Kings.

By June 2015, Skillz had launched 550 games and partnered with 1,100 game studios. In December 2017, Skillz's growth rate was 50,000%. In the same year, Skillz hired its one hundredth full-time employee. As of September 2017, 33% of Skillz's engineering team were women.

Software 
The Skillz platform integrates into mobile games to provide esports-related features. Skillz facilitates matching players with one another based on their skill levels. Players can also record or stream their games via the platform. Skillz currently has 18 million users registered on the platform, around 13,000 developer partners, and runs around two million tournaments per day for games such as Solitaire Cube, Bubble Shooter, and Dominoes. Skillz has hosted over 800 million tournaments. Of its users, roughly half are men and half are women.

Games 
There are games that have the Skillz multiplayer platform integrated onto them. Tether Studios is one such developer of Skillz games, which used the Skillz platform to add a cash-rewarded competition element to their Solitaire Cube game. Another game that uses Skillz is Outplay's Bubble Shooter League.

References 

Online video game services
Companies based in San Francisco
Companies listed on the New York Stock Exchange
Special-purpose acquisition companies